Elisabeth Osl (born 21 November 1985) is an Austrian cross-country mountain biker. She competed at the 2008 Summer Olympics, she finished in 11th.  At the 2012 Summer Olympics, she competed in the Women's cross-country at Hadleigh Farm, finishing in 15th place.

References

External links

Cross-country mountain bikers
Austrian female cyclists
Living people
Olympic cyclists of Austria
Cyclists at the 2008 Summer Olympics
Cyclists at the 2012 Summer Olympics
People from Kitzbühel
1985 births
Sportspeople from Tyrol (state)
21st-century Austrian women